Jean-Marie Kieffer (born September 29, 1960 - 8 March 2023) was a Luxembourgian composer.

References

1960 births
Living people
Luxembourgian composers